Sons & Daughters is an American sitcom television series about an extended blended family living close together in a neighborhood. The producers, creator Fred Goss (who also is the star of the show), Lorne Michaels (who was a co-creator of Saturday Night Live), and Nick Holly, flavored the show with a mixed atmosphere of improvisational and scripted humor. The show premiered on March 7, 2006, on ABC. The show is produced by Broadway Video (which also produces Saturday Night Live) and NBC Universal Television. It was canceled in late April 2006 after 10 episodes aired, leaving one unaired episode.

The whole series was aired on the Seven Network in Australia, including the final previously unaired episode, ending on August 6, 2007. Coincidentally, the Seven Network also screened the earlier Australian soap opera of the same name. In December 2010, ITV1 started showing the series in the United Kingdom for the first time, over four years since its American showing.  The show has also been aired on TV3 in Ireland.

Improvisational aspect
Sons & Daughters has been dubbed a "unique hybrid comedy"; the show followed the format used in Curb Your Enthusiasm, using a partly scripted, partly improvisational comedy dialogue. In an interview with co-creator Nick Holly from the Associated Press, he explained that the actors were presented not with a traditional script, but with a "short story" that "occasionally includes a line or two of dialogue, but is normally just this novelization."

Unlike the traditional sitcom, Sons & Daughters was not filmed with a live studio audience and did not use a laugh track for the show.

Plot synopsis
Cameron Walker's (Goss) world revolves around him and his extended family living in Hamilton, Ohio, which includes wife Liz (Vigman), his son Ezra (Matthews), his daughter Marni (Jourdain) and his son Henry (Einhorn) who Cameron didn't know existed, his mother and stepfather, Colleen and Wendal Halbert (Wallace-Stone, Gail), and his other plethora of brothers and sisters. He is considered the only sane person in his family and tries to fix any problem that arises within the family.

Cameron's sister and brother-in-law Sharon (Quinn) and Don Fenton (Lambert) seem to create more problems for him rather than themselves. The couple are almost always in deep denial about their personal issues, such as not having sex for several years.

Jenna (Walsh), Sharon and Cameron's half-sister, is a single mother of one who is continuously attracted to the "bad boy" personality, such as "Whitey" (Pitts), and steers away from the "nice guy" types, like Wylie (Harrington).

Their parents, Colleen and Wendal, love their family but have profound complications within their own relationship. Cameron constantly tries to help them solve their issues, but it doesn't always work out the way he expects.

Episodes
Below is the entire list of episodes from the series including a brief description.

Cancellation
Running against Fox Network's American Idol timeslot it did not receive the ratings that would merit a second season pickup, however it had been rumored that ABC executives liked the show. It also had a devoted fanbase, and on April 17, 2006, a fan started an online petition to bring the show back, which Fred Goss mentioned on his blog. It failed, and it was canceled late April, 2006. The shows cancellation was again confirmed by the creator Fred Goss on May 15, 2006.

Cast
Fred Goss – Cameron Walker
Gillian Vigman – Liz Walker
Jerry Lambert – Don Fenton
Alison Quinn – Sharon Fenton
Max Gail – Wendal Halbert
Dee Wallace-Stone – Colleen Halbert
Amanda Walsh – Jenna Halbert
Desmond Harrington – Wylie Blake
Greg Pitts – Tommy White "Whitey"
Eden Sher – Carrie Fenton
Randy Wayne – Jeff Fenton
Trevor Einhorn – Henry Walker
Noah Matthews – Ezra Walker
Lexi Jourden – Marni Walker
Lois Hall – Aunt Rae

References

External links
 

2000s American single-camera sitcoms
2006 American television series debuts
2006 American television series endings
American Broadcasting Company original programming
Television series by Universal Television
Television series by Broadway Video
Television shows set in Ohio